Mark Christopher is a conservative/libertarian talk radio host. His show titled The Mark Christopher Show initially broadcast on 99.7 WWTN and then, 1510 WLAC both in Nashville, Tennessee where he was named the Associated Press talk show of the year for 3 straight years, and the #1 talk show in Nashville in 2006.

Since that time The Mark Christopher Show has aired on KTRS St. Louis and Knews Radio in Palm Springs.

References

External links
 Official website

Year of birth missing (living people)
Living people
American libertarians
American talk radio hosts